Erika Ferraioli (born 23 March 1986) is an Italian swimmer.

At the 2008 Summer Olympics, she was part of the Italian 4 × 100 m freestyle relay team.  She competed in the women's 50m freestyle at the 2012 Summer Olympics in London, finishing with a time of 25.69 seconds in 32nd place in the heats, as well as being part of the 4 × 100 m freestyle team.

See also
 Italian swimmers multiple medalists at the international competitions

References

External links

1986 births
Living people
Swimmers from Rome
Swimmers at the 2008 Summer Olympics
Swimmers at the 2012 Summer Olympics
Swimmers at the 2016 Summer Olympics
Italian female freestyle swimmers
Olympic swimmers of Italy
European Aquatics Championships medalists in swimming
Mediterranean Games gold medalists for Italy
Mediterranean Games silver medalists for Italy
Swimmers at the 2013 Mediterranean Games
Swimmers at the 2018 Mediterranean Games
Medalists at the FINA World Swimming Championships (25 m)
Mediterranean Games medalists in swimming
Universiade silver medalists for Italy
Universiade medalists in swimming
Medalists at the 2013 Summer Universiade
21st-century Italian women